Elke Twesten (born July 7, 1963 in Scheeßel) is a German politician for the CDU in Lower Saxony who switched parties from the Alliance 90/The Greens in 2017.

Career
Twesten previously worked in the Hamburg Customs Administration. She was elected to the Lower Saxon Landtag in 2008. Since 2013, she has been Secretary of the Landtag. She is also spokesperson for women in the parliament.

Twesten defected to the CDU from the Greens in August 2017, thus depriving the Lower Saxony Parliament's SDP/Green coalition of its one-seat majority and triggering an early election in October 2017.

Personal life
Twesten is married and has three daughters.

References

External links
 
 Alliance 90/The Greens - Elke Twesten (archived 28 July 2017) archive.is
 Parliamentary profile

1963 births
Living people
Members of the Landtag of Lower Saxony
Women members of State Parliaments in Germany
21st-century German women politicians